Fighting Network Rings, trademarked as RINGS, is a Japanese combat sport promotion that has lived three distinct periods: shoot style puroresu promotion from its inauguration to 1995, mixed martial arts promotion from 1995 to its 2002 disestablishment, and the revived mixed martial arts promotion from 2008 onward.

RINGS was founded by Akira Maeda on May 11, 1991, following the dissolution of Newborn UWF. At that time, Maeda and Mitsuya Nagai were the only two people to transfer from UWF, wrestlers such as Kiyoshi Tamura, Hiromitsu Kanehara and Kenichi Yamamoto would later also transfer from UWF International.

Despite starting out as a shoot style wrestling promotion, RINGS showcased early mixed martial arts fights, as early as 1991, and notably promoted shoot style matches alongside these mixed-style shoot fights on the same cards. The promotion brought fighters from Shooto, Pancrase, Pro Wrestling Fujiwara Gumi and Submission Arts Wrestling to compete against RINGS fighters.

Tournaments

Mega Battle Tournament
Mega Battle Tournament 1992 (Oct 29, 1992 – Jan 23, 1993) – Chris Dolman
Mega Battle Tournament 1993 (Oct 23, 1993 – Jan 21, 1994) – Akira Maeda
Mega Battle Tournament 1994 (Sep 21, 1994 – Jan 25, 1995) – Volk Han
Mega Battle Tournament 1995 (Oct 21, 1995 – Jan 24, 1996) – Akira Maeda
Mega Battle Tournament 1996 (Oct 25, 1996 – Jan 22, 1997) – Volk Han
Mega Battle Tournament 1997 (Oct 25, 1997 – Jan 21, 1998) – Kiyoshi Tamura
Mega Battle Tournament 1998 (Oct 23, 1998 – Jan 23, 1999) – Team Georgia

King of Kings
King of Kings Tournament 1999 (Oct 28, 1999 – Feb 26, 2000) – Dan Henderson
King of Kings Tournament 2000 (Oct 9, 2000 – Feb 24, 2001) – Antônio Rodrigo Nogueira

Title Tournaments
Light Heavyweight Title Tournament 1997 (Mar 28 – Aug 13, 1997) – Masayuki Naruse
Middleweight Title Tournament 2001 (Apr 20 – Aug 11, 2001) – Ricardo Arona
Open-weight Title Tournament 2001 (Apr 20 – Aug 11, 2001) – Fedor Emelianenko

Other Tournaments
Rising Stars Heavyweight Tournament 2000 (Jul 15 – Sep 30, 2000) – Bobby Hoffman
Rising Stars Middleweight Tournament 2000 (Jul 15 – Sep 30, 2000) – Jeremy Horn
Absolute Class Tournament 2001 (Oct 20, 2001 – Feb 15, 2002) – Fedor Emelianenko

Championships

Open-Weight Championship

Light-Heavyweight Championship (−)

Middleweight Championship (−)

Japanese roster
Akira Maeda
Mitsuya Nagai
Yoshihisa Yamamoto
Masayuki Naruse
Tsuyoshi Kosaka
Wataru Sakata
Kiyoshi Tamura
Kenichi Yamamoto
Hiromitsu Kanehara
Ryuki Ueyama
Koichiro Kimura
Hiroyuki Ito
Yoshinori Nishi

Foreigners
RINGS' system was largely much inspired by organizations such as the National Wrestling Alliance and FIFA, and featured fighters from different countries organized into stables. These foreign fighters would then compete against RINGS' Japanese competitors and against each other.

Stables
 Netherlands – Dick Vrij, Hans Nijman, Gilbert Yvel, Joop Kasteel, Bob Schrijber, Herman Renting, Valentijn Overeem, Alistair Overeem, Chris Dolman.
 Australia – Chris Haseman, Elvis Sinosic.
 Bulgaria – Todor Todorov, Dimitar Petkov, Georgi Tonkov, Borislav Jeliazkov.
 Georgia – Zaza Tkeshelashvili, Tariel Bitsadze, Amiran Bitsadze.
 Russia – Fedor Emelianenko, Andrei Kopylov, Bazigit Atajev, Nikolai Zuyev, Mikhail Illoukhine, Volk Han.
 Brazil – Antônio Rodrigo Nogueira, Ricardo Arona, Renato Sobral, Gustavo Machado, Renzo Gracie.
 United Kingdom – Lee Hasdell, Chris Watts, Dexter Casey and Paul Cahoon.
 United States – Randy Couture, Dan Henderson, Kerry Schall, Bobby Hoffman, Jeremy Horn.

Decline
Maeda retired from active duty in 1998, leaving Tamura as the top star, but the collapse of UWF International and the subsequent rise of PRIDE provided competition that proved to be too much for the promotion. On February 15, 2002, RINGS ceased activity.

Many Japanese RINGS stars, including Masayuki Naruse, Wataru Sakata and Hiroyuki Ito, made the transition back into traditional puroresu (although Naruse continued to compete sporadically in MMA). Kiyoshi Tamura, Hiromitsu Kanehara, Yoshihisa Yamamoto and Tsuyoshi Kosaka continued competing in MMA, most notably for PRIDE. Mitsuya Nagai began a career in kickboxing before returning to traditional puroresu. The MMA promotion ZST was founded in November 2002 to accommodate former Japanese RINGS fighters who remained competitors in mixed martial arts.

Revival
Following the dissolution of Hero's and the conclusion of Maeda's involvement with FEG, Maeda revived the RINGS brand for a new series of MMA events named The Outsider. The first RINGS The Outsider event occurred on March 30, 2008. Over a dozen Outsider events have been held since.

The brand was resurrected once more on January 22, 2012 with Battle Genesis: Vol. 9, Volume 8 took place on September 20, 2001. The event was sanctioned by fellow mixed martial arts promotion ZST.

See also

 List of Fighting Network Rings events

References

External links
Rings event results at Sherdog

Japanese professional wrestling promotions
Mixed martial arts organizations
Sports organizations established in 1991
1991 establishments in Japan